Moose Creek is a creek in western Yukon, Canada.

The landscape surrounding Moose Creek lies in the Northern Cordilleran Volcanic Province. During the Cenozoic era, volcanic activity engulfed the Moose Creek area. However, the type of volcanic landform these volcanics represent is unknown.

See also
List of rivers of Yukon
List of volcanoes in Canada
List of Northern Cordilleran volcanoes
Volcanism of Canada
Volcanism of Northern Canada

References

Rivers of Yukon
Volcanism of Yukon
Cenozoic volcanism